MV Maj. Bernard F. Fisher (T-AK-4396) is a U.S. Military Sealift Command vessel named for US Air Force Medal of Honor recipient Bernard F. Fisher. The vessel is a civilian-owned and operated container ship under contract to deliver pre-positioned supplies and equipment under the Military Sealift Command's Prepositioning Program. The Fisher is one of eight (as of 2008) container ships that support Navy, Defense Logistics Agency, Air Force, Marine Corps and US Army operations as part of Maritime Prepositioning Ship Squadron Three.

The ship is owned and operated by Sealift, Inc., of Oyster Bay, New York. Originally named MV Sea Fox, the Fisher was renamed in October 1999 as part of its chartering for the Prepositioning Program.

References

Merchant ships of the United States
1984 ships
Container ships of the United States Navy